Juan de Izquierdo, O.F.M. (died 17 November 1602) was a Roman Catholic prelate who served as Bishop of Yucatán (1588–1602).

Biography
Juan de Izquierdo was ordained a priest in the Order of Friars Minor. On 13 June 1588, he was appointed during the papacy of Pope Clement VIII as Bishop of Yucatán. He served as Bishop of Yucatán until his death on 17 November 1602.

References

External links and additional sources
 (for Chronology of Bishops) 
 (for Chronology of Bishops) 

16th-century Roman Catholic bishops in Mexico
17th-century Roman Catholic bishops in Mexico
Bishops appointed by Pope Clement VIII
1602 deaths
Franciscan bishops